The Craighead County Road 513C Bridge is a historic bridge in rural northeastern Craighead County, Arkansas. It carries County Road 513C, a short stub leading east from the junction of County Roads 513 and 998, across an unnamed ditch. Its deck is made of timber overlaying steel. The bridge is a World War II-era structure, built in 1942.

The bridge was listed on the National Register of Historic Places in 1995.

See also
National Register of Historic Places listings in Craighead County, Arkansas
List of bridges on the National Register of Historic Places in Arkansas

References

Road bridges on the National Register of Historic Places in Arkansas
Bridges completed in 1942
Transportation in Craighead County, Arkansas
1942 establishments in Arkansas
National Register of Historic Places in Craighead County, Arkansas
Steel bridges in the United States
Truss bridges in the United States